Downstream is a 1929 British crime film directed by Giuseppe Guarino and starring Chili Bouchier, Harold Huth and Marie Ault.

Plot
A detective goes undercover by taking a job as a bargee in order to prevent a woman's death.

Cast
 Chili Bouchier - Lena 
 Harold Huth - Peter Carras 
 Marie Ault - Martha Jaikes 
 David Dunbar - Digger Brent 
 Judd Green - Tug Morton 
 Frank Dane - Crook

References

Bibliography
 Shafer, Stephen C. British popular films, 1929-1939: The Cinema of Reassurance. Routledge, 1997.

External links
 

1929 films
British detective films
Films directed by Giuseppe Guarino
1929 crime films
British black-and-white films
British crime films
British silent feature films
1920s British films
Silent mystery films
Silent thriller films